Trostian – mountain peak in an array of the Skole Beskids (Eastern Beskids), peak spine Stryiska-Sanskoyi Verhoviny and limited by valleys Opir River and Holovchanka River. Mountain Trostyan has a height of 1,232 metres (4,042 ft) and the steep (30-40 °) slopes at north-eastern. The top is flat.

The mountain has slopes for skiing in the east, north and west.

Gallery

References

External links 
  Trostian
 Trostian SKI Weather, Ukraine

Mountains of Ukraine
Mountains of the Eastern Carpathians
Stryi Raion